The list of ship launches in 1718 includes a chronological list of ships launched in 1718.


See also

References

1718
Ship launches